Croton sylvaticus is a tree in the family Euphorbiaceae. It is commonly known as the forest fever-berry. These trees are distributed in forests from the east coast of South Africa to Tropical Africa.

Flowers and fruit
Fruit, light green when young, turning to orange or red, trilobed, oval in shape, hairy.

Uses
Used as a general timber, for poles, posts and as a fuel.

Phytochemistry
Mwangi et al 1998 find β-caryophyllene oxide, α-humulene-1,2-epoxide, hardwickiic acid, β-sitosterol and stigmasterol in the extracts. This contrasts with Sadgrove et al 2019 who find almost entirely bicyclogermacrene in the essential oil.

Traditional medicine
Sap from leaves is used for healing cuts, bark is used  in the treatment of malaria, a decoction from the bark of the roots is taken orally as a remedy for tuberculosis, an infusion of the leaves acts as a purgative.

Gallery

See also
 Forests of KwaZulu-Natal

References

 Pooley, E. (1993). The Complete Field Guide to Trees of Natal, Zululand and Transkei. .

sylvaticus
Flora of South Africa
Flora of Africa
Afrotropical realm flora